John S. Crosby  (October 16, 1932 – March 2, 2022) was a lieutenant general in the United States Army. He was commissioned through ROTC at North Carolina State University. From 1987 to 1989, he served as Deputy Commanding General for Training of the United States Army Training and Doctrine Command (TRADOC). Crosby died at the age of 89 in 2022.

References

1932 births
2022 deaths
United States Army generals
People from St. Louis County, Missouri